The Georgefischeriaceae are a family of smut fungi in the Basidiomycota, class Exobasidiomycetes. Species in the family have a widespread distribution in both warm temperate areas and Old World tropical regions.

The genus name of Georgefischeria is in honour of George William Fischer (1906 - 1995), an American botanist and phytopathologist, who wrote 'Manual of the North American smut fungi'.

References 

Ustilaginomycotina
Fungal plant pathogens and diseases
Basidiomycota families
Taxa named by Franz Oberwinkler